"Good Time Music" is a song originally recorded by American pop rock band the Lovin' Spoonful in 1965. Written by John Sebastian, it appeared on the 1966 Elektra Records compilation What's Shakin'. The song has been described as "a sort of manifeseto of the group's optimism in its jaunty rhythms and celebration of the return of good time music to the radio."

The Beau Brummels version

Rock group the Beau Brummels recorded a version of "Good Time Music" and released it as a single in 1965. It reached number 97 on the Billboard Hot 100 
and number 13 on the Canadian Singles Chart. 
It was the fifth and final single release by the band on the Autumn Records label.  The B-side was "Sad Little Girl", a song written by guitarist Ron Elliott from the band's second album The Beau Brummels, Volume 2. "Sad Little Girl" was called "gorgeous" by music critic Bruce Eder, 
while author and journalist Richie Unterberger said the song might have been a better choice as the band's third single, following "Laugh, Laugh" and "Just a Little," than actual choice "You Tell Me Why."

Chart performance

References

Songs about music
1965 singles
Parlophone singles
The Beau Brummels songs
The Lovin' Spoonful songs
Songs written by John Sebastian
1965 songs